Rachel Holzer (8 November 1899 - 14 November 1998) was an internationally acclaimed Australian Jewish theatre actress and director.

As an actress, her most famous role was that of the Mother in Aleksander Marten's 1936 film I Have Sinned.

References

External links

1899 births
1998 deaths
Australian stage actresses
Australian theatre directors
Jewish Australian actresses